Togo competed at the 2020 Summer Olympics in Tokyo. Originally scheduled to take place from 24 July to 9 August 2020, the Games were postponed to 23 July to 8 August 2021, due to the COVID-19 pandemic. Since the nation made its debut in 1972, Togolese athletes participated in every edition of the Summer Olympic Games, except for two occasions, the 1976 Summer Olympics in Montreal, and the 1980 Summer Olympics in Moscow because of the African and the US-led boycotts, respectively.

Togo stood with four athletes in four sports. The Togolese athletes did not win any medals, marking the third consecutive Olympiad without any Togolese medals. Togo had previously won a single medal; Benjamin Boukpeti at the 2008 Summer Olympics.

Competitors
The following is the list of number of competitors in the Games.

Athletics

Togo received a universality slot from the World Athletics to send a male track and field athlete to the Olympics.

Track & road events

Rowing

Togo qualified one boat in the women's single sculls for the Games by finishing second in the B-final and securing the fourth of five berths available at the 2019 FISA African Olympic Qualification Regatta in Tunis, Tunisia.

Qualification Legend: FA=Final A (medal); FB=Final B (non-medal); FC=Final C (non-medal); FD=Final D (non-medal); FE=Final E (non-medal); FF=Final F (non-medal); SA/B=Semifinals A/B; SC/D=Semifinals C/D; SE/F=Semifinals E/F; QF=Quarterfinals; R=Repechage

Swimming

Togo received a universality invitation from FINA to send a male top-ranked swimmer in his respective individual event to the Olympics, based on the FINA Points System of June 28, 2021.

Table tennis
 
Togo received an invitation from the Tripartite Commission to compete in the men's singles event, signifying the nation's return to the sport for the first time since London 2012.

References

Nations at the 2020 Summer Olympics
2020
2021 in Togolese sport